Sire is a 1991 novel by the French writer Jean Raspail. It tells the story of how monarchy returns to France as the 18-year-old Philippe Pharamond de Bourbon ascends the throne in 1999. The novel received the Grand prix du roman de la Ville de Paris and the Alfred de Vigny Prize.

References

External links
 Sire at the writer's website 

1991 French novels
Fiction set in 1999
French-language novels
Novels about royalty
Novels by Jean Raspail
Novels set in the 1990s